Kashmere Gate or Kashmiri Gate is a gate located in Old Delhi in UT of Delhi, India. it is the northern gate to the historic walled city of Old Delhi. Built by the Mughal Emperor Shah Jahan, the gate is so named because it was at the start of a road that led to Kashmir.

Now it is also the name of the surrounding locality in North Delhi, in the Old Delhi area, and an important road junction as the Red Fort, ISBT and Delhi Junction railway station lie in its vicinity.

History

It was the area around the North gate of the walled city of the Delhi, leading to the Laal Quila, the Red Fort of Delhi, the gate was facing towards Kashmir, so it was named Kashmere Gate under British Raj. The monument can still be seen. The southern gate to the walled city is called Delhi Gate.

When the British first started settling in Delhi in 1803, they found the walls of Old Delhi city, Shahjahanabad lacking repairs, especially after the siege by Maratha Holkar in 1804, subsequently, they reinforced the city's walls. They gradually set up their residential estates in the Kashmere Gate area, which once housed Mughal palaces and the homes of nobility. The gate next gained national attention during the Mutiny of 1857. Indian soldiers fired volleys of cannonballs from this gate at the British and used the area to assemble for strategizing fighting and resistance.

The British had used the gate to prevent the mutineers from entering the city. Evidence of the struggles is visible today in damage to the existing walls (the damage is presumably cannonball related). Kashmere Gate was the scene of an important assault by the British Army during Indian rebellion of 1857, during which on the morning of 14 September 1857 the bridge and the left leaf of the Gate were destroyed using gunpowder, starting the final assault on the rebels towards the end of Siege of Delhi.

After 1857, the British moved to Civil Lines, and Kashmere Gate became the fashionable and commercial centre of Delhi, a status it lost only after the creation of New Delhi in 1931. In 1965, a section of the Kashmere Gate was demolished to allow faster movement of vehicular traffic. Since then, it has become a protected monument of ASI.

In the early 1910s, employees of the Government of India Press settled around Kashmere Gate, it included a sizable Bengali community, and the community Durga Puja organized by Delhi Durga Puja Samiti that they started in 1910 is the oldest one in Delhi today. The present building of Delhi State Election Commission’s Office on Lothian Road near Kashmiri Gate was built from 1890 to 1891. The two-story building housed  St. Stephen's College, Delhi from 1891 until 1941, when it moved to its present campus.

It had been listed as a notorious market between 2016 and 2017 by the USTR for selling counterfeit auto parts.

St. James' Church

St. James Church also known as Skinner's Church, was commissioned by Colonel James Skinner (1778–1841), a distinguished Anglo-Indian military officer, famous for the cavalry regiment Skinner’s Horse. It was designed by Major Robert Smith and built between 1826-36.

ISBT
The Maharana Pratap Inter-state Bus Terminus or ISBT is the oldest and one of the biggest Inter State Bus Terminals in India, operating bus services between Delhi and 7 states, Haryana, Jammu & Kashmir, Punjab, Himachal Pradesh, Uttar Pradesh, Rajasthan and Uttarakhand states. It opened in 1976. Also nearby is Majnu Ka Tilla, known for its Tibetan refugee settlement and also the Majnu ka Tila Gurudwara built by Baghel Singh in 1783, to mark the tilla or mound where a Sufi nicknamed Majnu met Sikh Guru, Guru Nanak. here in July 1505.

Railway station
The Old Delhi Railway Station of Delhi, i.e. the Delhi Junction Railway station, built like a fort, stands here, with two opposite sides namely Kashmere Gate & Chandni Chowk. The two localities are linked by an elevated pedestrian bridge called Kodiya Pul.

Metro Station

The Kashmere Gate station of the Delhi Metro, lies on the only trijunction of Delhi Metro Red (Shaheed Sthal (New Bus Adda) - Rithala), Yellow Lines (Jahangir Puri - HUDA City Center) and Violet Line (Kashmere Gate - Ballabhgarh). It is a transfer station between the Red Line on the highest upper level , the Yellow Line and Violet Line on the lowest level. Kashmere Gate also serves as the Headquarters for the Delhi Metro.

GPO
The place also has the General Post Office of Indian Postal Service, which is one of the oldest in the country.

Indraprastha University
Guru Gobind Singh Indraprastha University (formerly known as Indraprastha University), a state university of New Delhi, was also located at Kashmere Gate. It was housed in the building which was formerly Delhi College of Engineering (DCE) & Delhi Institute of Technology (DIT). Both the colleges have shifted to bigger campuses in Bawana, Rohini & Dwarka sector-3, sector-14(GGSIPU), and now the campus is handed over to Indira Gandhi Delhi Technical University for Women.

Museum: Dara Shikoh Library
A library established by the Mughal prince Dara Shikoh still exists in Kashmere Gate and is being run as an archaeological museum by the Archaeological Survey of India.

Historic sites

Historical institutions
Madrasa Aminia, established in 1897 by Amin al-Dehlawi is one of the historical Islamic institutions in Kashmiri Gate.

See  also 
 Khooni Darwaza, the northern gate of the outer walls of the Delhi of Sher Shah Suri.
Delhi Gate is the southern gate of gates in the historic Walled city of (old) Delhi, or Shahjahanbad in 1638 AD.

References

Gates in India
Infrastructure completed in 1835
History of Delhi
Roads in Delhi
Gates of Delhi
Archaeological monuments in Delhi
North Delhi district
Monuments of National Importance in Delhi
Notorious markets